Newburgh On Ythan Golf Club was founded in 1888 by John Udny of Udny and a band of "founding fathers" and is one of the oldest golf courses in Scotland.

In 1897, Crown Prince Vajiravudh of Siam stayed for one month at the village hotel The Udny Arms, and spent his time learning to play golf on the links course. He was instructed by the professional of the day. The prince had completed his military training at Sandhurst and was studying History & Law at Christ Church, Oxford at the time of his Scottish break. Vajiravudh went on to be King and ruled Siam (now Thailand) from 1910 until his death in 1925.

The course was originally presented to the people of the tiny fishing village of Newburgh for their enjoyment. The original 9 holes measured 1 mile, 401 yards (1 976 m) but it was changed around 1901 and was played as 18 holes up until the design was extended back to 18 holes in 1996 and now has a growing reputation as a ‘tough but fair’ traditional gorse lined links course where classic links shot making is required.

The club's clubhouse was built with the support of lottery and local authority funding and was officially opened by the former British Open Champion, Paul Lawrie in 2001.

The Golf Links is a Par 72, Competition Standard Scratch 72, measuring 6,423yards.  The quality and standard of the course and greens is very high and it is acknowledged in Scottish golfing circles that the course offers a true test of links golf.  Indeed, 2008 saw the course to hold the North East District Men's Amateur Open Championship, a Scottish Golf Union Order of Merit ranking event.

References

External links
Official web site

Golf clubs and courses in Aberdeenshire